Shireen Sapiro (born 25 January 1991 in Krugersdorp) is a South African Paralympic swimmer, most notable for her performance at the 2008 Summer Paralympics, winning a gold medal for the 100 m backstroke. She also claimed a bronze medal at the London 2012 Paralympics in the 100m backstroke.

On 9 April 2004, Sapiro was seriously injured in a waterskiing accident which resulted in her left leg being paralysed.

At the 2009 Maccabiah Games, Sapiro was appointed flag bearer for the South African delegation at the opening ceremony. While Sapiro generally competes in Paralympic events, she competed in the open competition of the swimming events against able-bodied swimmers.

Footnotes

External links
 

Living people
South African Jews
Jewish swimmers
Paralympic gold medalists for South Africa
Paralympic swimmers of South Africa
Swimmers at the 2008 Summer Paralympics
World record holders in paralympic swimming
Maccabiah Games medalists in swimming
1991 births
Swimmers at the 2012 Summer Paralympics
Medalists at the 2008 Summer Paralympics
Medalists at the 2012 Summer Paralympics
S10-classified Paralympic swimmers
Maccabiah Games silver medalists for South Africa
Maccabiah Games bronze medalists for South Africa
African Games silver medalists for South Africa
African Games medalists in swimming
Competitors at the 2011 All-Africa Games
Paralympic medalists in swimming